Linwood Shopping Center is a shopping center located on the East Side of Kansas City, Missouri on 31st Street & Prospect Avenue across the street from Lucile H. Bluford Library. The location surrounds the area from 30th Street to Linwood Boulevard on the North/South and along Prospect Avenue on the West/East.

Tenants
 Sun Fresh Market (opened in June 2018) 
 Arvest Bank
 Family Dollar
 Footaction USA
 H&R Block
 Gen X Clothing
 Popeyes Chicken
 Linwood Chinese Express
 Cricket Wireless
 Rainbow
 Pizza Hut

Competition
 Midtown Marketplace

References
 KC celebrates opening of new East Side grocery store  (June 18, 2018)
 East Side developer eyes TIF or shopping centers' rehab (2-24-2006)
 Community Development Corporation of Kansas City 
 Community Stability and Community Ownership

Economy of Kansas City, Missouri